229-2299 Girls Against Shit is the fifth studio album by Shit and Shine, released on 3 August 2009 by Riot Season. In writing for The Quietus, Toby Cook said "SAS expectorate wave after wave of uncomfortable, yet engrossing pandemonium" and "SAS have created something truly vital, and dare it be said a work of near genius."

Track listing

Personnel
Adapted from the 229-2299 Girls Against Shit liner notes.
Shit and Shine
 Craig Clouse – vocals, instruments
Production and additional personnel
 Andrew Smith – cover art

Release history

References

External links 
 
 229-2299 Girls Against Shit at Bandcamp

2009 albums
Shit and Shine albums